Arvie Lowe Jr. (born February 3, 1978) is an American actor. He is best known for his role as Boots in the 1992 film Newsies.

Career 
Lowe's other acting credits include City Guys, Moesha, Sister, Sister, Smart Guy, Jessie and Thea. Lowe also had a recurring role on Lizzie McGuire as Mr. Dig. He was also featured in the films Bébé's Kids (1992), The Adventures of Rocky and Bullwinkle (2000) and Trippin' (1999).

Filmography

Film

Television

References

External links

1978 births
Living people
20th-century American male actors
21st-century American male actors
Male actors from Los Angeles
African-American male actors
American male child actors
American male film actors
American male television actors
20th-century African-American people
21st-century African-American people